"Miss Teacher Bangs a Boy" is the tenth episode in the tenth season of the American animated television series South Park. The 149th episode of the series overall, it originally aired on Comedy Central in the United States October 18, 2006.

In the episode, Cartman is appointed to the post of school hallway monitor at South Park Elementary, and takes it personally when an infraction is committed in his jurisdiction. Meanwhile, Kyle discovers that his little brother Ike is in a romantic relationship with his kindergarten teacher Miss Stevenson. Kyle and Cartman team up to put a stop to the inappropriate behavior.

The episode features a parody of the television series Dog the Bounty Hunter.

Plot
Cartman is made school hallway monitor, investing him with "authoritah", and assumes the identity of "Dawg the Hallway Monitor" (a parody of Duane "Dog" Chapman). During a shift, Cartman finds a drawing by Ike expressing a crush on kindergarten teacher Miss Stevenson. After Miss Stevenson sees the drawing, she admits to Ike that she loves him, and the pair begin a sexual relationship, which is introduced through a montage set to REO Speedwagon's "Can't Fight This Feeling".

One day, Kyle enters Miss Stevenson's house looking for Ike and catches the pair together in the bathtub. He tries to inform his parents, but Ike deliberately interrupts and changes the subject. Kyle tells the police that a teacher is having sex with a student, but the police begin to call Ike 'lucky' once they realize that the teacher in question is an attractive woman. Dejected, Kyle tells his friends (especially Cartman, the only one who takes him seriously) about the problem, mentioning that Ike and Miss Stevenson are even sneaking out into the hallway to kiss. Incensed that such behavior is going on in the hallway right under his nose,  Cartman finds them and catches them in the act; Miss Stevenson is arrested and fired from her job. She escapes a prison sentence by using the "Mel Gibson Defense," claiming she is an alcoholic and was not responsible for her actions. Ike, aware that Kyle indirectly played a role in the events, disowns him as his brother.

After a quick trip to rehab, Miss Stevenson talks Ike into fleeing with her to Milan. Cartman learns their plane leaves in the morning and searches their hotel with Kyle and his new crew. Hotel employees call the police due to the commotion they're causing. With the police now present and after her, Miss Stevenson tries to flee with Ike, but they are spotted and cornered on the roof. Miss Stevenson tries to fulfill the suicide pact she had made with Ike by hurling themselves off the roof. After Kyle gives an impassioned speech that Ike should enjoy his life before considering a serious relationship, however, Ike reneges at the last second, while Miss Stevenson falls to her death. Cartman then continues a video he has been doing during the episode saying not being Christian results in ending up like Miss Stevenson, until a cop tells him he must get off the roof, for Cartman to say he was done anyhow.

Production
The idea to satirize Duane "Dog" Chapman and the television series Dog the Bounty Hunter was first implemented into the season nine episode "Die Hippie, Die". It was removed entirely because series co-creators Trey Parker and Matt Stone felt that not enough viewers would understand the parody, and the idea was saved for a future episode. During the production of "Mystery of the Urinal Deuce", season ten's previous episode, the idea was brought back up and several scenes were animated. The parody was again scrapped, this time because Parker and Stone felt dissatisfied with the episode and virtually overhauled it. During production of "Miss Teacher Bangs a Boy", the idea was again brought up, and this time it would remain in the episode.

Reception
Dan Iverson of IGN gave the episode a score of 8.0 out of 10, summarizing his review with: "Although some may disagree, we believe that there wasn't really anything offensive in this episode. The subject matter definitely could have swung that way, but instead the over-exaggerated satire lent the episode humor that wouldn't normally be found in the situation. We thank the creators of South Park for turning around the 10th season, as the first couple episodes weren't great, but since they came back from their hiatus it has been one good episode after another. Let's all hope that this trend continues."

Chapman reacted to this episode in his autobiography You Can Run But You Can't Hide, stating that he was very pleased with it, commenting, "You know you've really made it when they include you on their show."

Saying the word "nice" after hearing the viral meme number 69 likely originated from this episode after the police react to Ike and Miss Stevenson's relationship.

See also 
 Female-male statutory rape
Mary Kay Letourneau
Pamela Rogers Turner
Debra Lafave
That's My Boy

References

External links
 "Miss Teacher Bangs a Boy" Full episode at South Park Studios
 

South Park (season 10) episodes
Reality television series parodies
Television episodes about pedophilia
Suicide in television